is a public university in Kitakyushu, Fukuoka, Japan. The predecessor of the school was founded in 1914, and it was chartered as a university in 1949.

References

External links
 Official website 

Educational institutions established in 1914
Public universities in Japan
Universities and colleges in Fukuoka Prefecture
1914 establishments in Japan
Dental schools in Japan